Evercreech Junction was a railway station at Evercreech on the Somerset and Dorset Joint Railway.

Originally opened in 1862 as "Evercreech" on the original S&D line from Burnham-on-Sea to Broadstone, it became in 1874 the junction for the northwards extension towards Bath that bankrupted the company.  A station opened on the Bath extension more than a mile to the north of Evercreech Junction, much nearer to the village of Evercreech, was called Evercreech Village, and later Evercreech New.

The junction itself was to the north of the station, where there were also marshalling yards.  Branch trains to and from Burnham and Highbridge started and finished at Evercreech in latter years.  To the south of the station a level crossing carried the main A371 road across the line.

In 1963 the station featured in "Branch Line Railway", a BBC documentary on the Joint Railway presented by John Betjeman. However, it was closed three years later along with the whole line as part of the Beeching axe. The station inn was renamed The Silent Whistle on the closure of the line.

Today the residual station buildings are private homes, with the former station track bed forming their gardens. The former goods yard is a small industrial estate, while the station hotel was renamed again as The Natterjack in the 1970s.

References

External links 
 https://web.archive.org/web/20070518103155/http://www.sdjr.net/locations/evercreech.html
 Station on navigable O.S. map
 Part one of "Branch Line Railway" on YouTube, showing the station as filmed in 1962.
 https://www.bbc.co.uk/iplayer/episode/b03495yn/lets-imagine-a-branch-line-railway-with-john-betjeman

Former Somerset and Dorset Joint Railway stations
Rail junctions in England
Disused railway stations in Somerset
Railway stations in Great Britain opened in 1862
Railway stations in Great Britain closed in 1966
Beeching closures in England
1862 establishments in England
Mendip District